Death Rides a Horse is a 1967 Italian Spaghetti Western directed by Giulio Petroni, written by Luciano Vincenzoni and starring Lee Van Cleef and John Phillip Law.

Plot
Bill (John Phillip Law), a boy whose father was killed and mother and sister were raped and murdered in front of him by a gang, sets out 15 years later to exact revenge, having used the time to become an expert marksman with a gun. Each of the outlaws bears a characteristic that Bill memorized while watching his family slaughtered and his house set on fire: the first has a tattoo of four aces on his chest, the second a scar, the third one a distinctive earring and the fourth (who was the one who saved young Bill from the burning house) wears a necklace bearing a skull; while he saw the face of the fifth, he never saw the face of the man who saved him from the fire.

As he begins his journey, a gunfighter named Ryan (Lee Van Cleef) is released from a prison after serving 15 years there. He was framed for an armed robbery by the very same men who murdered Bill's family. When they meet along the way, Ryan gets the better of Bill, who is blinded by vengeance, but he does Bill no harm. In the next town, Ryan asks for a man named Cavanaugh (Anthony Dawson), whom Bill recognized later as the man with four aces tattoo. Bill manages to kill Cavanaugh in a duel, but the more experienced Ryan insists on tracking the other outlaws alone. They cross paths again in Lyndon City, where Ryan meets rich banker named Walcott (Luigi Pistilli) and demands his share of the robbery 15 years ago. Walcott stages a robbery on his own bank and frames Ryan. When the tables are turned later, Bill reciprocates, helping Ryan escape from a jail. An equally determined Bill sets out ahead of him.

Bill reaches a Mexican town, where he recognizes the man with the big earring and guns him down. He is captured by the outlaws, beaten and buried alive from the neck down (he had also recognized the man with the scar and Walcott). Left to die in the hot sun, he is rescued by Ryan, who shoots several men standing guard. Preparing for the gang's return, Bill notices that Ryan is wearing a necklace with a skull. Ryan admits he was present during the murders, but arrived late and did not participate; he also rescued Bill from the fire. He gives his word that once the outlaws have been dealt with, he will remain to face whatever justice Bill seeks.

In a final shootout during a sand storm, the last remaining man who killed Bill's family has him dead to rights, only to be killed by Ryan's thrown knife. Bill nonetheless insists on revenge. Ryan's gun is empty, so Bill tosses a bullet to him. He has just one bullet left now himself. Ryan turns his back and walks away, daring Bill to shoot him in the back. Bill fires, but it is only to kill a surviving outlaw. A grateful Ryan then watches as he mounts his horse and rides away.

Cast

Lee Van Cleef as Ryan
John Phillip Law as Bill Meceita 
Mario Brega as One-Eye, Walcott henchman in waistcoat
Luigi Pistilli as Walcott
Anthony Dawson as Burt Cavanaugh/Manina 
Jose Torres as Pedro
Franco Balducci as Lyndon City sheriff
Bruno Corazzari as Walcott bartender
Felicita Fanny as Martita
Ignazio Leone as Minister
Carlo Pisacane as Holly Spring station master
Angelo Susani as Paco
Guglielmo Spoletini as Manuel
Vivienne Bocca as Bill Meceita's sister
Walter Giulangeli as Mr. Meceita
Elena Hall as Mrs. Meceita
Mario Mandalari as Walcott henchman
Nazzareno Natale (c.s.c.) as Member of Pedro's gang
Ennio Pagliani as Walcott henchman
Giovanni Petrucci as Walcott henchman
Romano Puppo as Lyndon City deputy
Richard Watson as bartender
Archie Savage as Vigro

Uncredited (in order of appearance)
Carla Cassola as Betsy
Nerina Montagnani as the Minister's wife
Nino Vingelli as Card player
Remo Capitani as Gold escort member
José Terrón as Walcott's henchman
Jeff Cameron as Cavanaugh's henchman

Production
The screenplay and story of Death Rides a Horse was written by Luciano Vincenzoni. Vincenzoni went to work with director Giulio Petroni after having a falling out with Sergio Leone while the latter was making The Good, The Bad, and the Ugly.

Releases

Death Rides a Horse was released in Italy in August 1967. The film was released uncut in the United Kingdom and United States in 1969.

Reception

A contemporary review, the Monthly Film Bulletin declared the film to be a "display piece" for John Phillip Law and Lee Van Cleef, noting that Van Cleef was "in excellent form." The review declared the film to be "less gimmicky than most Italian Westerns, and all the better for it." The review noted that the recurring flashbacks were "tiresome" but had relevance to the narrative. "Robe" of Variety said that the film wouldn't reach the popularity of earlier Clint Eastwood westerns, noting that the script borrows from other Italian Westerns and that "good color photography and an interesting score by Ennio Morricone are the pic's strong points. Otherwise, all technical elements are routine."

Analysis

In his investigation of narrative structures in Spaghetti Western films, writer Bert Fridlund ranges Death Rides a Horse, together with Day of Anger as prime examples of a "tutorship variation" that further develops the play on age/experience between the protagonists in For a Few Dollars More, with Lee Van Cleef playing the older partner in all three films. In the "Tutorship" films, a younger protagonist seeks the more or less reluctant partnership of an older one, but differences of motivation eventually bring them into conflict.

References

Sources

External links
 
 
 
 
  (alternative link)

1967 films
Spaghetti Western films
1960s buddy films
1967 Western (genre) films
English-language Italian films
Films directed by Giulio Petroni
1960s Italian-language films
Italian films about revenge
Films scored by Ennio Morricone
1960s vigilante films
Italian buddy films
United Artists films
Films with screenplays by Luciano Vincenzoni
Films shot in Almería
Rape and revenge films
Italian vigilante films
1960s exploitation films
1960s Italian films